Horsehay and Dawley railway station was a station in Horsehay, Shropshire, England. The station was opened in 1859, closed in 1962, then reopened in 1976 as part of the Telford Steam Railway.

Originally, the station was on the former Wellington and Severn Junction railway. It consisted of one platform with a signal box at the end of the platform controlling access to the goods yard. It is now the working base of the Telford Steam Railway.

References

Further reading

Disused railway stations in Shropshire
Railway stations in Great Britain opened in 1859
Railway stations in Great Britain closed in 1962
Former Great Western Railway stations